The Queen's Award for Equestrianism is an annual British prize founded in 2005 and awarded "for outstanding services to equestrianism". Nominations are evaluated by a committee formed by chairmen of prominent equestrian associations. Three names are suggested to the board of trustees of the British Horse Society who recommend a recipient to the Queen for ultimate approval.

Past Recipients

References

Equestrianism
British sports trophies and awards
British awards
Awards established in 2005
2005 establishments in the United Kingdom
Annual events in the United Kingdom